A seat filler is a person who fills in an empty seat during an event. There are two types of seat fillers:

 A person who subscribes to a seat-filling theatre club. Members of these clubs help fill in unsold seats for theatre, music, film, sporting events, dance performances and other live events. The producers of the event give complimentary tickets to the seat-filling organization, who pass them on to their members. The producers get a fuller audience and therefore a better experience for the paying patrons (and talent), while the seat-filler is able to see an event for a small service charge. Within the industry, this is also referred to as "papering the house".Some seat-filling companies charge no surcharge per ticket and only a membership based fee. This model is popular in cities with a larger number of shows and therefore a higher number of tickets to go around.
 A person who takes up spare seats when the person allocated the seat is elsewhere. An example of this is the Academy Awards in which members of the audience are on the stage receiving their awards, or because they are involved in producing the show. Seat fillers are primarily employed so that when TV cameras show audience shots, there are no empty seats.

Benefits to the Shows
 Increased awareness of their show (especially helpful if new)
 Higher concession sales 
 Fuller audience for a better show experience
 Marketing to a vocal audience
 Private and no cost. Most seat filler services offer their service for free to the shows with an attached promise that their members will not publicly state where they received the tickets from as to not impact future sales

In popular culture
In the Two and a Half Men episode "My Doctor Has a Cow Puppet", Charlie tries to set up Alan with one of his friends who work as a seat filler at award ceremonies.
In the Seinfeld episode "The Summer of George", Kramer works as a seat filler at the Tony Awards.
The plot of the 2004 movie The Seat Filler revolves around a seat-filler who meets a burgeoning pop star during an event.
In the movie Now You See Me, they mention that the audience are a bunch of seat fillers.
In the Family Guy episode "Call Girl", Peter works as a seat filler for babies during ultrasounds.
At the 87th Academy Awards, Neil Patrick Harris mentioned the seat fillers, explaining their meaning, and joked with Steve Carell as if he were a seat filler.
In The Simpsons episode The Mansion Family, a seat filler takes Homer Simpson's seat at an award.

See also 

 Claque

References

Entertainment